
Gmina Góra is an urban-rural gmina (administrative district) in Góra County, Lower Silesian Voivodeship, in south-western Poland.

Neighbouring gminas
Gmina Góra is bordered by the gminas of Bojanowo, Jemielno, Niechlów, Rydzyna, Święciechowa and Wąsosz.

Villages
Apart from the town of Góra, the gmina contains the villages of Borszyn Mały, Borszyn Wielki, Bronów, Brzeżany, Chróścina, Czernina, Czernina Dolna, Czernina Górna, Glinka, Gola Górowska, Grabowno, Jastrzębia, Kłoda Górowska, Kruszyniec, Łagiszyn, Ligota, Nowa Wioska, Osetno, Osetno Małe, Polanowo, Radosław, Rogów Górowski, Ryczeń, Sławęcice, Ślubów, Stara Góra, Strumienna, Strumyk, Sułków, Szedziec, Wierzowice Małe, Wierzowice Wielkie, Witoszyce, Włodków Dolny and Zawieścice.

Twin towns – sister cities

Gmina Góra is twinned with:
 Herzberg am Harz, Germany

References

Gora
Góra County